Shirley van der Lof (born November 7, 1986 in Haaksbergen, Overijssel) is a racing driver from the Netherlands, and grand daughter of former Formula One-driver Dries van der Lof.  Besides her racing career, she has studied  "real estate and broking". She strives to become the first Dutch female formula one driver.

Shirley first started driving in go-karts at age 14, and was immediately hooked to the speed. In 2001, at age 15, she won her first go-karting championship.  In 2006, she started in the Benelux Formula Ford championship. Her first years in auto racing resulted in a fair number of crashes, but also a fair share of success.

In 2008, she started racing in the ATS Formel 3 Trophy for HS Technik Motorsport in a Dallara F304 OPC Challenge. In the first 8 races of her debut season, she finished on the podium 4 times: two times in 3rd place and two times in 2nd place.
In 2019 she tested for W series but was not selected.

References

External links 
 Official website

1986 births
Living people
People from Haaksbergen
Dutch racing drivers
Dutch female racing drivers
Sportspeople from Overijssel